The Caribes de Anzoátegui is a baseball team in the Venezuelan Professional Baseball League based in Puerto la Cruz, Anzoátegui.

Franchise history
In January 1987, a local businessmen group based in Puerto la Cruz, Venezuela stated their intention to Venezuelan Professional Baseball League to pursue an expansion franchise. Finally on July 15, 1987, the franchise was founded with 21 stockholders and begun a struggle for finding a second expansion team for it was a league requirement. It was not until 1990 that the Venezuelan league awarded the Puerto la Cruz-based franchise, and the Caribes de Oriente debuted in the 1991–92 season. The team's name remained until 2005, when it changed to Caribes de Anzoátegui up to the present.

Throughout their history, the Caribes have won four titles (2010–11, 2014–15, 2017–18 and 2020–21) in seven finals (2003–04, 2010–11, 2013–14, 2014–15, 2017–18, 2019–20 and 2020–21).

On May 14, 2013, former Chicago White Sox, Detroit Tigers and Caribes de Anzoátegui player Magglio Ordoñez became a co-owner of the team.

Since the 2010–11 season, they have not missed the playoffs once, the longest such stretch in team history.

Uniforms

Current Roster

Notable players

Eliezer Alfonzo
Tony Armas 
Rafael Betancourt
Luis González     
Jonathan Herrera
Víctor Martínez
José Miguel Nieves
Magglio Ordóñez
Tomás Pérez
Renyel Pinto
Carlos Silva
Carlos Zambrano
Rafael Ortega

See also
Caribes de Anzoátegui players
Caribes de Oriente players

Team's yearly record
30 seasons totals

2015-20 Playoff Format

2020- Playoff Format

Retired numbers

Awards
Most Valuable Player (Víctor Davalillo Award):
Magglio Ordoñez 1996–97,
Eliezer Alfonzo 2007–08.

Overall Offensive Performer of the year:
Scott Cepicky 1992–93,
Magglio Ordoñez 1997–98,
Eliezer Alfonzo 2007–08.

Comeback Player of the Year:
Pedro Chávez 1992–93,
José Francisco Malavé 2000–01,
Alex Herrera 2005–06,
José Castillo 2012–13.

Manager of the Year (Chico Carrasquel Award):
Marco Davalillo 2007–08,
Alfredo Pedrique 2012–13,
Alfredo Pedrique 2013–14.

Pitcher of the Year (Carrao Bracho Award):
Alex Herrera 2007–08,
Andrew Baldwin 2010–11,
Renyel Pinto 2011–12.

Closer of the Year:
Alex Herrera 2001–02|,
Elio Serrano 2003–04,
Jon Hunton 2011–12.

Setup Man of the Year:
Jean Toledo 2012–13.

References

External links
Official site

Anzoategui
Sport in Puerto la Cruz